shipper may refer to:
Someone who provides or sends goods for shipment, by packaging, labeling, and arranging for transit, or who coordinates the transport of goods
Shipping (fandom), someone who supports a romantic relationship between two real or fictional people, usually on the Internet